Giulio Maria Lucchesi (died after 1799) was an 18th-century Italian violinist and composer. He was born in Pisa, Italy, but was also active under the archbishop in Salzburg, Austria. He returned to Italy in 1799. Among his masters were Moriano, later Pietro Nardini. He helped train Filippo Gragnani. He left several pieces of vocal and instrumental music.

Sources

References

Italian male composers
Italian male classical composers
18th-century Italian composers
18th-century Italian male musicians
Year of birth unknown
Year of death unknown

fr:Filippo Gragnani